Raughton Head is a hamlet in Cumbria, England, located  south of Carlisle.

Toponymy
the name Raughton Head is most likely derived from the Old English ragu–tūn, meaning "Farmstead where moss or lichen grows", with the later addition of hēafod, meaning "hill". It has been recorded as Ragton (1182) and Raughtonheved (1367).

History
Raughton Head was previously located within Castle Sowerby civil parish. The hamlet's previous church was dedicated to St. Jude. The church's building date is unknown, but it was rebuilt in 1678 by Edward Rainbowe and then again in 1760.

Governance
Raughton Head is primarily governed by Dalston civil parish. It is then governed by the City of Carlisle, and falls within the Carlisle constituency.

Geography
Raughton Head is located between two rivers, the River Caldew and the River Roe.

Places of worship
Raughton Head's only place of worship is All Saints Church, located within the Diocese of Carlisle. It was built in the 18th and 19th century, and is Grade II listed.

Education
Raughton Head's only school is Raughton Head Church of England Primary School.

References

Hamlets in Cumbria
Dalston, Cumbria
Inglewood Forest